A braid algebra can be:
A Gerstenhaber algebra (also called an antibracket algebra).
An algebra related to the braid group.